Joseba Agirre may refer to:

 Joseba Agirre (footballer, born 1964), Spanish footballer
 Joseba Agirre (footballer, born 1977), Spanish footballer